Emanoil Manole Dumitrescu (1 June 1907 – 1 August 1988) was a Romanian football striker.

International career
Emanoil Dumitrescu played three games at international level for Romania, making his debut in a friendly which ended with a 3–2 victory against Bulgaria. He also played one game at the successful 1929–31 Balkan Cup in a 2–1 home victory against Yugoslavia. Emanoil Dumitrescu's last game for the national team was a friendly which ended with a 2–1 loss against Yugoslavia.

Honours
Venus Bucureşti
Divizia A: 1928–29, 1931–32, 1933–34
Romania
Balkan Cup: 1929–31

References

External links
Emanoil Dumitrescu profile at Labtof.ro

1907 births
1988 deaths
Romanian footballers
Romania international footballers
Association football forwards
Venus București players
People from Târgu Neamț